Arne Gunnar Valter Hülphers (April 4, 1904, Trollhättan – July 24, 1978, Norrköping Municipality) was a Swedish jazz pianist and bandleader.

Hülphers played early in his career at the club Felix-Kronprinsen, from 1924 to 1927, and played in dance bands in Sweden into the early 1930s. He founded his own ensemble in 1934 which became one of Sweden's most important jazz big bands, touring Europe and recording until 1940. Sidemen in his group included Miff Görling, Zilas Görling, and Thore Jederby. Later in his career, he concentrated more on popular musical styles; he led an orchestra in which Fred Bertelmann played, and in 1956 married singer Zarah Leander, whom he had previously accompanied as bandleader. They were married until his death in 1978.

References
 Kjellberg, Erik: "Arne Hülphers". The New Grove Dictionary of Jazz. 2nd edition, ed. Barry Kernfeld.

Swedish jazz pianists
Swedish jazz bandleaders
1904 births
1978 deaths
20th-century pianists